Sajid Mahmood (born 10 January 1981) is a Pakistani cricketer. He played in 28 first-class and 12 List A matches between 2001 and 2009. He made his Twenty20 debut on 25 April 2005, for Rawalpindi Rams in the 2004–05 National Twenty20 Cup.

References

External links
 

1981 births
Living people
Pakistani cricketers
Islamabad cricketers
Rawalpindi cricketers
Rawalpindi Rams cricketers
Place of birth missing (living people)